Beatrice Jacquart (October 28, 1911 – November 29, 1990) was an American politician who served as a member of the Kansas House of Representatives from 1957 to 1966 as the representative of the 121st District in Haskell County, Kansas.

1957-1958 Kansas House Committee Assignments
 Chairman of Printing
 Vice Chairman of Memorials
 Cities of the Third Class
 State Affairs
 State Parks and Memorials

1959-1960 Kansas House Committee Assignments
 Chairman of Memorials
 Cities of the Third Class
 Roads and Highways
 State Affairs

1961-1962 Kansas House Committee Assignments
 Chairman of Cities of the Third Class
 Vice Chairman of State Affairs
 Vice Chairman of Public Health
 Memorials
 Municipalities

1963-1964 Kansas House Committee Assignments
 Chairman of Public Health
 Chairman of Memorials
 Vice Chairman of Printing
 Cities of the Third Class
 State Affairs

1965-1966 Kansas House Committee Assignments
 Chairman of Public Health
 Chairman of Memorials
 Chairman of Printing
 Cities of the Third Class
 State Affairs

References

Republican Party members of the Kansas House of Representatives
People from Haskell County, Kansas
Women state legislators in Kansas
1911 births
1990 deaths
20th-century American politicians
20th-century American women politicians